Señorita República Dominicana 1970 was held on January 24, 1970. There were 28 candidates who competed for the national crown. The winner represented the Dominican Republic at the Miss Universe 1970 . The Virreina al Miss Mundo will enter Miss World 1970 and Miss International 1971. Only the 27 province, 1 municipality entered. On the top 10 they showed their evening gown and answered questions so they could go to the top 5. In the top 5 they would answer more questions.

Results

Señorita República Dominicana 1970 : Sobeida Alejandra Fernández Reyes (Valverde)
Virreina al Miss Mundo : Fatima Magdalena Schéker Ocoa (La Altagracia)
1st Runner Up : Mayra Sanz (Séibo)
2nd Runner Up : Laura Taveraz (Distrito Nacional)
3rd Runner Up : Ilda Fernandez (Santiago)

Top 10

María Ramírez (Puerto Plata)
María Díaz (La Romana)
Nina Hidalgo (Baoruco)
Iris Ynoa (Monte Cristi)
Reyna Fabian (Barahona)

Special awards
 Miss Rostro Bello – Mayra Sanz (Séibo)
 Miss Photogenic (voted by press reporters) - Iris Ynoa (Monte Cristi)
 Miss Congeniality (voted by Miss Dominican Republic Universe contestants) - Velkis Grullon (Azua)

Delegates

 Azua - Velkis Mary Grullon Alvarado
 Baoruco - Ninalkis Mate Hidalgo Dosamante
 Barahona - Ana Reyna Fabian Cruz
 Dajabón - Mercedes La Rosa de la Rosa Cruz
 Distrito Nacional - Ana Laura Taveraz Duarte
 Duarte - Soledad Edith García Moreno
 Espaillat - María Teresa del Río Valleres
 Independencia - Fior Magdalena Laughten Ruiz
 La Altagracia - Fatima Magdalena Schéker Ocoa
 La Estrelleta - Gloria María Valenciano Rijo
 La Romana - María Luisa Díaz Tejeda
 La Vega - Carmen Elena Rodríguez Figueroa
 María Trinidad Sánchez - Rosa Tatiana del Valle Santillán
 Monte Cristi - Iris Magdalena Ynoa de la Cruz
 Pedernales - Agnes Carmen Carmona Juaganes
 Peravia - Carol María Rosado Languasco
 Puerto Plata - María Alejandrina Ramírez Cruz
Salcedo - Katherine Ynes Amelo Lozano
 Samaná -  María Teresa Oviedo Meran
 Sánchez Ramírez - María Reyna Melo Ruiz
 San Cristóbal - Margarita María Reyes Fantino
 San Juan de la Maguana - María Caridad Rosario Vallenat
 San Pedro - María del Carmen Sánchez Sánchez
 Santiago - Ilda María Fernandez Sánchez y Diez
 Santiago Rodríguez - María Alejandra Sosa Guanavez
 Séibo - Mayra Angelica Sanz Marios
 Santo Domingo de Guzmán - Gloria Raquel Arcienega Ruiz
 Valverde - Sobeida Alejandra Fernández Reyes

Trivia
Puerto Plata entered in Miss Dominican Republic 1968.

Miss Dominican Republic
1970 beauty pageants
1970 in the Dominican Republic